Regli is a surname. Notable people with the surname include:

Laura Gore (1918–1957; born Laura Emilia Regli), Italian actress
Francesco Regli (1802–1866), Italian writer
Luca Regli (born 1962), Swiss neurosurgeon

See also
Reggi